is a passenger railway station located in the city of  Takaishi, Osaka Prefecture, Japan, operated by the private railway operator Nankai Electric Railway. It has the station number "NK17".

Lines

Layout
The station consists of one elevated island platform with the station building underneath.

Platforms

Adjacent stations

History
It was renamed  on 1 August 1941 and to its present name on 1 December 1966.

Passenger statistics
In fiscal 2019, the station was used by an average of 10,184 passengers daily.

Surrounding area
 Seifu Nankai Junior and Senior High School
 Takaishi City Konan Junior High School
 Takaishi City Takaishi Elementary School

See also
 List of railway stations in Japan

References

External links

  

Railway stations in Japan opened in 1901
Railway stations in Osaka Prefecture
Takaishi, Osaka